Beal is a surname. Notable people with the surname include:

Andrew Beal (born 1952), American billionaire
Arthur Harold Beal (1896–1992), creator of Nitt Witt Ridge
Brandon Beal (born 1983), American singer, songwriter, & producer
Bradley Beal (born 1993), American professional basketball player
Dana Beal (born 1947), American social and political activist
Ernest Frederick Beal (1885–1918), English war hero, recipient of the Victoria Cross
Foster Ellenborough Lascelles Beal (1840–1916), American ornithologist
Harry Beal (1930–2021), American Navy SEAL
Jack Beal (1931–2013), English painter
James Hartley Beal (1861–1945), Ohio educator, legislator, author, and pharmacist
Jeff Beal (born 1963), American composer
John Beal (actor) (1909–97), American actor
John Beal (composer) (born 1947), American composer
Keith Beal (born 1933), English painter, musician, composer and author
Lorna Beal (1923–2020), Australian cricketer
Nick Beal (born 1970), British rugby union player
Phil Beal (born 1945), English footballer
Sam Beal (born 1996), American football player
Samuel Beal (1825–1989), English Oriental scholar
Scott Beal (1890–1973), American actor
William James Beal (1833–1924), American botanist

See also
Beale, surname
Biehl, surname

English-language surnames